Zavyazka is a rural locality (a selo) and the administrative center of Zavyazenskoye Rural Settlement, Kikvidzensky District, Volgograd Oblast, Russia. The population was 1,073 as of 2010. There are 13 streets.

Geography 
Zavyazka is located on Khopyorsko-Buzulukskaya plain, on the Zavyazka River, 9 km north of Preobrazhenskaya (the district's administrative centre) by road. Preobrazhenskaya is the nearest rural locality.

References 

Rural localities in Kikvidzensky District